Fred Swaniker (born 1976) is a Ghanaian serial entrepreneur and leadership development expert on a mission to help the world's most extraordinary talent fulfil its potential. Swaniker recognized the importance of leadership and education while serving as the headmaster of a secondary school founded by his mother at the age of 17, and believed that the missing ingredient needed to transform Africa was good leadership. To solve that problem, he started the African Leadership Group – an ecosystem of organizations that are catalyzing a new era of ethical, entrepreneurial African leaders. 

Over the past 16 years, he has founded and led the pre-university African Leadership Academy based in South Africa, the African Leadership University with campuses in Mauritius and Rwanda, the African Leadership Network, ALX (a next-generation leadership development platform) and The Room (a global community of top talent). Collectively, these endeavours aim to transform Africa by developing 3 million African leaders by 2035. He also recently announced a collaboration with Amazon Web Services (AWS) to power The Room's Intelligence Platform and expand ALG's reach to on-board millions of talented individuals in Africa, Asia, Latin America, North America, and Europe and match them with career opportunities.

In 2019, Time magazine recognized him as one of the "100 Most Influential People in the World" and Fast Company included African Leadership Group among the 50 most innovative companies[3] in the world.

Early life and education
His father was a lawyer and magistrate; his mother is an educator. Both are Ghanaian, but when he was 4 his family fled Ghana after the military coup and by the time he was 18 years old he had lived in four countries in Africa. He attended Macalester College in Minnesota. He was initially employed by McKinsey & Company in Johannesburg, before attending the Stanford Graduate School of Business in California, where he received an MBA and was named an Arjay Miller Scholar, a distinction awarded to the top 10% of each graduating class at Stanford.

Career
While at Stanford, Swaniker alongside his colleague and co-founder Chris Bradford wrote the business plan for African Leadership Academy, a special pan-African school that would groom the future leaders of Africa. This was based on his belief that the single largest impediment to Africa's progress was the lack of good leadership. He leveraged his Silicon Valley connections to find financial backing and launched the Academy immediately after graduating in 2004. The full-time residential boarding school teaches leadership and entrepreneurial skills to students from across Africa while preparing them for universities around the world. By 2017, almost 1,000 future leaders had joined the ranks of the Academy. For most students, tuition is waived, provided they promise to return to Africa after graduating from college.

In 2014 at a TED conference in Brazil, Swaniker announced an expansion of his vision:  a new network of 25 African universities that would ultimately groom 3 million leaders by 2060. By the end of 2016, two campuses had opened: one in Mauritius and the other in Rwanda. Fast Company recognized this network of universities as the 3rd 'Most Innovative Company' in Africa and CNN released a feature calling the university 'the Harvard of Africa'. Graca Machel, widow of Nelson Mandela, serves as the Chancellor of the university, while Donald Kaberuka, former President of the African Development Bank, serves as the Chairman of the university's Global Advisory Council. In 2021, he also announced a bold new strategy for the African Leadership Group to educate

Recognition 
Swaniker's work as an educational entrepreneur has been praised by the U.S. President Barack Obama and other prominent global figures.

He has been recognized as a TED Fellow (2009) and a World Economic Forum Young Global Leader (2012). He was named one of the Top Ten Young Power Men in Africa by a 2011 Forbes magazine online feature. Echoing Green recognized him as 'one of the top 15 social entrepreneurs in the world' in 2006. In 2017, Fred Swaniker received two honorary doctorates—one from Middlebury College in the USA and the second from Nelson Mandela University in South Africa. In 2018, he received a third honorary doctorate from Macalester College in the USA

In April 2018, Paul Kagame appoints him as a board chairperson of board of directors with hope that he adds value and help push the country's agenda of generating  revenues from tourism.

In 2019 he was recognized by Time magazine as one of the "100 Most Influential People in the World" and Fast Company included African Leadership Group among the 50 most innovative companies[ in the world.

References

Fred Swaniker - Co-Founder, African Leadership Academy

Living people
1976 births
Stanford Graduate School of Business alumni
Macalester College alumni
Social entrepreneurs
Ghanaian emigrants to South Africa
McKinsey & Company people
People from Johannesburg